Sirjang Lal Tandon also known as "Jugi" Tandon, was born in India . He is chairman and CEO of Celetronix, Inc. He is known for leading his company, Tandon Corporation (originally Tandon Magnetics) in the disk drive industry, creating what became the industry-standard double-sided floppy drive disk read-and-write heads.

Education and early career
Tandon grew up in Punjab, India. In 1960, he moved to the United States with $3,000, earning a BS at Howard University, master's degree in mechanical engineering at Kansas State University and an MBA at the University of Santa Clara.

He worked as an engineer from 1970 to mid 1975 at IBM and Memorex.  In late 1975, he left IBM for Pertec Inc. in Chatsworth, but left that same year to start Tandon Magnetics in his Chatsworth garage with $7,000.

Tandon Corporation

Tandon invented the double-sided floppy drive used by IBM in the IBM PC and worked as OEM manufacturer for Xerox, Tandem and Prime Computer. In late 1982, Tandon was #1 in the disk-drive industry, and his company was named Forbes magazine's "Up and Comer of the Year". The $150-million value of his stock placed "Jugi", at age 41, on the Forbes list of the 400 richest Americans. With this wealth, he built a 30-room home on 20 acres in Chatsworth.

 
In 1996, Sirjang created JT Storage (Jugi Tandon Storage), back in Chatsworth, CA.

References

Los Angeles Times : 25 August 1992 - JAMES F. PELTZ article
Los Angeles Times : 12 January 1993 - JAMES F. PELTZ article
Computer Business Review : 14 February 1996 - "JUGI TANDON'S CARTRIDGE DISK FIRM JTS TO REVERSE INTO ATARI"
Dataquest : 21 December 2002 - The IT Indians article

1940s births
Living people
Indian computer scientists
20th-century Indian engineers
Engineers from Punjab, India
20th-century Indian inventors
Indian mechanical engineers